The Jefferies-Crabtree House is a historic house at 300 Jefferson Street in Clarendon, Arkansas.  It is a two-story red brick structure, with a hip roof pierced by a central shed-roof dormer and a pair of eyebrow louvered attic vents.  The front facade is symmetrically arranged, with tripled sash windows on either side of the center entrance, which is recessed and has a projecting narrow portico supported by slender round columns.  The house was designed by Estes Mann whose practice was based in Memphis, Tennessee, and was built in 1923 for Alfred Jefferies, whose family owned mercantile and lumber businesses.

The house was listed on the National Register of Historic Places (as "Jefferies-Craptree House") in 1984.

See also
National Register of Historic Places listings in Monroe County, Arkansas

References

Houses on the National Register of Historic Places in Arkansas
Colonial Revival architecture in Arkansas
Houses completed in 1923
Houses in Monroe County, Arkansas
National Register of Historic Places in Monroe County, Arkansas